Woolston Rovers are a rugby league team based in Warrington. The open age teams play in the National Division of the Rugby League Conference.

History

Woolston Rovers
Woolston Rovers Rugby Club was founded at the Lido Country Club on Manchester Road, Woolston in 1959. The first game played by Woolston Rovers was against Cadishead in the 1960–61 season with Woolston losing 58–8. For the first two seasons Woolston had no pitch, and played all their games away from home. At the start of the third year they acquired a pitch in Victoria Park, where they played until they moved to Bennetts Recreation Ground, Padgate.

The Jubilee Pavilion at Bennetts Recreation Ground was opened in 1978. Along with the clubhouse and changing facilities, Rovers had three playing pitches. These playing facilities were used to the full when the junior section got into full swing in 1978. From 1978 up to 2002 Rovers had in excess of 10 teams per season.

Woolston Rovers were one of the original ten clubs invited to join BARLA's National League in 1986, this later became the National Conference League in 1992, Rovers were champions for the first three years and then runners-up for the next two.

Woolston continued to flourish until arsonists destroyed the Jubilee Pavilion in October 2002, along with all the memorabilia within. With the club needing to rebuild, a summer club was launched under the name Warrington Woolston Rovers

With just four junior teams remaining, a new committee formed in 2004 breaking away from the control of the open-age team. Calling themselves Woolston Rovers Juniors they struggled to keep the remaining teams together.

Confusion between Woolston Rovers and the summer team Warrington Woolston Rovers had led to Woolston Rovers' winter team being relegated even though they had won their league and then failing to have a team entered for the 2004-5 season. The summer club then broke away and renamed themselves Warrington Wizards. On a more positive note, Woolston Rovers were allowed to rebuild their home ground.

At the end of the 2006 season the Woolston Rovers committee decided to relaunch an open age team. An applications to the North West Counties league was accepted but Woolston Rovers had to start in Division 6. They were Division 6 champions in their first year back and this was followed by finishing the next four seasons in the top two league positions to win back-to-back promotions.

Warrington Wizards
Warrington Woolston Rovers, were formed in 2003 to allow Woolston Rovers to rebuild at a local level following the fire that had destroyed their clubhouse. They played at Wilderspool Stadium and joined the newly formed National League Three. They went on to beat Teesside Steelers 42–6 in the final at Winnington Park to be crowned the inaugural champions.
 
In their second season of National League rugby, Warrington Woolston Rovers finished the season in third spot, defeating Bradford Dudley Hill in the play-off to make the Grand Final in Halton Stadium, Widnes, where they lost to Coventry Aquatic Bears by 48–24.

The end of that season marked a revamp for the team, the summer Rugby League Conference team breaking away from Woolston altogether, changing their name to Warrington Wizards and adopting the colour purple.

The next five seasons saw the Wizards reach the play-offs on each occasion without actually managing to make it to the Grand Final. Wizards recorded a then record 108–0 victory over Birmingham Bulldogs in June 2005, which was the first time that a hundred points had been scored on the ground. This was surpassed by Wizards when they defeated Cottingham Phoenix 124–0 in May 2007.

2008 saw Wizards miss out on the ‘Minor Premiership’ in the final game when they were narrowly beaten at eventual Grand Final winners Celtic Crusaders Colts, and they were then defeated in the elimination semi-final play-off at home by Featherstone Lions. The Wizards had a successful run in 2008 Challenge Cup with a first round away win at St Mary's University, Twickenham and then a home win over Stanningley in the second round which put them into the hat with the professionals in the third round where they drew Salford City Reds who beat them 66–10.

In 2010, Wizards beat Huddersfield Underbank Rangers 23–18 Grand Final in the Grand Final at the Halliwell Jones Stadium to win the Rugby League Conference National Division title. In comparison, 2011 was a bit of an anti-climax as the Wizards failed to make the play-offs for the first time.

Merger
Warrington Wizards merged with Woolston Rovers in readiness for the 2013 season and submitted an application to join the National Conference League under the Woolston Rovers name although it will be as the Wizards that they compete in the 2013 Challenge Cup. By merging with Woolston Rovers they joined the open age sector with the juniors to form the club they are today.

Woolston Rovers has developed in their new home of Monk's Sports club from one open age team and three junior teams to currently two open age teams and thirteen juniors ranging from cubs (5–6) to under 15's. With the merger between the two teams the junior section decided to recognise this by reranming themselves as Woolston Rovers Wizards.

Club honours
 Rugby League Conference National Division: 2003 (as National League 3), 2010
 NWC Development Plate Winners under 15s 2014
 NWC Development Cup Winners U12's 2014
 NWC Development Cup Winners U15's 2015

Player Records
All Time Leading Pointscorer - Nathan Pemberton (2217)
Most Points In A Season - Nathan Pemberton (197)
Most Appearances - Sean Boyle (412)
Most Tries In A Single Game - Adam Files (6)
Most Conversions In A Season - Nathan Pemberton (71)
Most Drop Goals In A Single Game - Jonathan Wilson (3)

References

External links
 Warrington Wizards on youtube

Rugby League Conference teams
BARLA teams
Sport in Warrington
1959 establishments in England
2003 establishments in England
Rugby clubs established in 1959
Rugby clubs established in 2003
Rugby league teams in Cheshire
English rugby league teams